The 2010–11 Regionalliga season was the seventeenth since its re-establishment after German reunification and the third as a fourth-level league within the German football league system. It was contested in three divisions with eighteen teams each.

Team changes from 2009–10

Movement between 3. Liga and Regionalliga
The champions of the three 2009–10 Regionalliga divisions were promoted to the 2010–11 3. Liga. These were SV Babelsberg 03 (North), 1. FC Saarbrücken (West) and VfR Aalen (South).

Holstein Kiel, Borussia Dortmund II and Wuppertaler SV Borussia were relegated from the 2009–10 3. Liga after finishing the season in the bottom three places.

Movement between Regionalliga and fifth-level leagues
Goslarer SC and FC St. Pauli II were relegated from North division. Tennis Borussia Berlin went into administration and hence were relegated as well. They, however, ended the season in a position which would have sealed relegation anyway. Hansa Rostock II decided to withdraw from the league for financial reasons resulting in FC Oberneuland avoiding relegation.
The three teams which would have been relegated as a result of finishing bottom of the West division (Eintracht Trier, Wormatia Worms and Borussia Mönchengladbach II) remain in the league as Rot-Weiss Essen, Bonner SC and Waldhof Mannheim were excluded due to financial reasons.
FC Bayern Alzenau and Eintracht Bamberg were relegated after finishing bottom at the end of the South division's season. Wehen Wiesbaden II remain in the league after SSV Reutlingen went into administration and hence were excluded from the league.

The relegated teams were replaced by teams from the fifth-level leagues of the German league pyramid and allocated to one of the three divisions. Eintracht Braunschweig II as winners of an Oberliga Niedersachsen-Ost, TSV Havelse as winners of an Oberliga Niedersachsen-West, Energie Cottbus II as NOFV-Oberliga Nord champions and RB Leipzig as winners of the NOFV-Oberliga Süd joined the Northern division. NRW-Liga champions SC Wiedenbrück and  runners-up Arminia Bielefeld II along with Oberliga Südwest champions FC 08 Homburg were included to the Western division. Finally, 1899 Hoffenheim II as winners of the Oberliga Baden-Württemberg, FC Memmingen as Bayernliga champions and FSV Frankfurt II as Hessenliga champions were added to the Southern division.

Movement between divisions
In order to achieve a size of eighteen teams for each division, Wormatia Worms were moved from the Western to the Southern division for this season.

Regionalliga Nord (North)

League table

Top goalscorers
Source: kicker (German)

25 goals
  Benjamin Förster (Chemnitzer FC)

18 goals
  Marc Heider (Holstein Kiel)

16 goals
  Daniel Frahn (RB Leipzig)
  Bastian Henning (VfB Lübeck)

14 goals
  Rafael Kazior (Hamburger SV II)

13 goals
  Terrence Boyd (Hertha BSC II)
  Fabian Klos (VfL Wolfsburg II)
  Max Wegner (SV Wilhelmshaven)

12 goals
  Lars Fuchs (Hannover 96 II)
  Fiete Sykora (Holstein Kiel)

Stadia and locations

Regionalliga West

League table

Top goalscorers
Source: kicker (German)

18 goals
  Robert Mainka (SC Wiedenbrück 2000)

15 goals
  Alban Meha (Eintracht Trier)
  Andrew Wooten (1. FC Kaiserslautern II)

12 goals
  Ben Abelski (Fortuna Düsseldorf II)
  Jerome Assauer (Wuppertaler SV Borussia)
  Daniel Ginczek (Borussia Dortmund II)
  Petar Slisković (FSV Mainz 05 II)
  Simon Terodde (1. FC Köln II)

11 goals
  Fabian Bäcker (Borussia Mönchengladbach II)
  Marcus Fischer (SV Elversberg)
  Damien Le Tallec (Borussia Dortmund II)
  Lukas Mössner (Eintracht Trier)

Stadia and locations

Regionalliga Süd (South)

League table

Top goalscorers
Source: kicker (German)

19 goals
  Kai Herdling (1899 Hoffenheim II)

18 goals
  Simon Brandstetter (SC Freiburg II)

17 goals
  Christian Bickel (SC Freiburg II)

16 goals
  Rudolf Hübner (Wormatia Worms)

15 goals
  Tobias Damm (Hessen Kassel)

14 goals
  Andreas Mayer (Hessen Kassel)

12 goals
  Oliver Heil (SV Darmstadt 98)

11 goals
  Michael Schürg (SV Darmstadt 98)
  Cenk Tosun (Eintracht Frankfurt II)

10 goals
  Marcos Alvarez (Eintracht Frankfurt II)
  Aziz Bouhaddouz (FSV Frankfurt II)
  Ali Pala (Stuttgarter Kickers)

Notes
 Cenk Tosun was transferred to Gaziantepspor during the winter transfer window.
 Marcos Alvarez was transferred to Bayern Munich II during the winter transfer window.

Stadia and locations

References

External links
Regionalliga on the official DFB website 
kicker 

Regionalliga seasons
4
German